There are 428 named lakes in Oneida County, Wisconsin, along with 701 with no names. Together they make up 68,447 acres of surface area. Willow Flowage, at 6,306 acres, is the largest. Oneida County is the county with the second largest number of lakes in Wisconsin, after neighboring Vilas County.

Named lakes are listed below. Alternate names are indicated in parentheses.

See also 

 List of lakes in Wisconsin

References 

Lakes in Oneida County
Wisconsin